This is a list of Scottish football transfers, featuring at least one 2022–23 Scottish Premiership club or one 2022–23 Scottish Championship club, which were completed during the summer 2022 transfer window. The window officially opened on 10 June and closed on 1 September.

List

See also
 List of Scottish football transfers winter 2021–22
 List of Scottish football transfers winter 2022–23

References

Transfers
Scottish
2022 in Scottish sport
2022 summer